Chrysotoxum flavifrons is a species of North American hoverfly.

Description
12.3 - 17.4 mm in length.

Distribution
Canada and United States.

References

Insects described in 1842
Diptera of North America
Syrphinae
Taxa named by Pierre-Justin-Marie Macquart